Halipeginae is a subfamily of trematode in the family Derogenidae.

Genera 
The following genera are accepted within Halipeginae:

 Allogenarchopsis Urabe & Shimazu, 2013 
 Allotangiopsis Yamaguti, 1971
 Anguillotrema Chin & Ku, 1974
 Arnola Strand, 1942
 Austrohalipegus Cribb, 1988
 Caudovitellaria Bilqees, Khalid & Talat, 2010
 Chenia Hsu, 1954
 Deropegus McCauley & Pratt, 1961
 Dollfuschella Vercammen-Grandjean, 1960
 Genarchella Travassos, Artigas & Pereira, 1928
 Genarchopsis Ozaki, 1925
 Halipegus Looss, 1899
 Magnibursatus Naidenova, 1969
 Monovitella Ataev, 1970
 Tangenarchopsis Urabe & Nakano, 2018
 Thometrema Amato, 1968
 Vitellotrema Guberlet, 1928

References 

Plagiorchiida
Animals described in 1926